Loxosceles accepta is a species of venomous recluse spider in the family Sicariidae. It is native to Peru. The coloration of L. accepta is similar to the coloration of L. laeta. It is readily identifiable by features of the male and female genitalia.

References 

Sicariidae
Spiders described in 1960